Listroderes is a genus of underwater weevils, subfamily Cyclominae, in the beetle family Curculionidae. There are more than 170 described species in Listroderes.

See also
 List of Listroderes species

References

Further reading

External links

 

Cyclominae
Articles created by Qbugbot